Juan Arroyo (died 16 December 1656) was a Roman Catholic prelate who served as Auxiliary Bishop of Seville (1654–1656).

Biography
On 7 December 1654, Juan Arroyo was appointed during the papacy of Pope Innocent X as Auxiliary Bishop of Seville and Titular Bishop of Utica. In 1655, he was consecrated bishop by Pedro Tapia, Archbishop of Seville. He served as Auxiliary Bishop of Seville until his death on 16 December 1656.

See also 
Catholic Church in Spain

References

External links and additional sources
 (for Chronology of Bishops) 
 (for Chronology of Bishops) 

1656 deaths
17th-century Roman Catholic bishops in Spain
Bishops appointed by Pope Innocent X